Balmoral is a former railway station which was located on the Picton – Mittagong loop railway line. It served Balmoral, a small town in the Macarthur Region of New South Wales, Australia.

History
The station opened on 2 December 1878 as Big Hill Lower Siding, was renamed Bargo in 1881, and finally Balmoral in 1888. The station along with the Loop Line was closed in 1978.

There are no remains of the station, but the Station Masters cottage still exists and is occupied by a retired railway worker.

References

Disused regional railway stations in New South Wales
Railway stations in Australia opened in 1878
Railway stations closed in 1978
Main Southern railway line, New South Wales